Donald Albert Milton (1923-1974) was an Australian rugby league footballer who played in the 1940s and 1950s.

Background
Milton was born in Bankstown, New South Wales on 22 December 1923.

Playing career
Milton joined Western Suburbs during his military service in 1944. He played seven seasons with Wests between 1944-1950, which included an appearance playing second-row in the victorious Western Suburbs team that won the 1948 Grand Final. Milton also played in the 1950 Grand Final and retired after the game.

Death
Milton died at Cronulla, New South Wales on 29 September 1974, aged 51.

References

1923 births
1974 deaths
Western Suburbs Magpies players
Australian rugby league players
Rugby league second-rows
Rugby league players from Sydney